The Flood Marker of 1771 is a monument that marks the high point of a flood of the James River on May 27, 1771, that killed around 150 people near Richmond, Virginia.

It was listed on the National Register of Historic Places in 1971.

References

External links
The Flood of 1771 - Historical Marker Database

Monuments and memorials on the National Register of Historic Places in Virginia
National Register of Historic Places in Henrico County, Virginia
Monuments and memorials in Virginia